John Joseph Counihan (1879 – 30 October 1953) was an Irish politician. He was a member of Seanad Éireann from 1922 to 1936 and from 1938 to 1951. He was first elected to the Seanad in 1922. He did not serve in the 2nd Seanad. From 1938 onwards, he was elected by the Agricultural Panel. He was variously an independent, Cumann na nGaedheal and Fine Gael member of the Seanad.

References

1879 births
1953 deaths
Independent members of Seanad Éireann
Fine Gael senators
Cumann na nGaedheal senators
Members of the 1922 Seanad
Members of the 1925 Seanad
Members of the 1928 Seanad
Members of the 1931 Seanad
Members of the 1934 Seanad
Members of the 3rd Seanad
Members of the 4th Seanad
Members of the 5th Seanad
Members of the 6th Seanad
Irish farmers